James Anthony Traficant Jr. (May 8, 1941 – September 27, 2014) was an American politician who served as a Democratic member of the United States House of Representatives from Ohio. A staunch economic populist known for his flamboyant personality, he represented the 17th Congressional District, which centered on his hometown of Youngstown and included parts of three counties in northeast Ohio's Mahoning Valley. He was expelled from the House in 2002 after being convicted of ten felony counts, including taking bribes, filing false tax returns, racketeering, and forcing his congressional staff to perform chores at his farm in Ohio and houseboat in Washington, D.C. He was sentenced to prison and released on September 2, 2009, after serving a seven-year sentence.

Traficant died on September 27, 2014, following a tractor accident at his farm in Green Township, Ohio.

Early life and education
Born into a working-class Catholic family in Youngstown, Ohio, Traficant was the son of Agnes (née Farkas) and James Anthony Traficant Sr. He was of mostly Italian and Hungarian ancestry. Traficant graduated from Cardinal Mooney High School in 1959 before receiving a B.S. in education from the University of Pittsburgh in 1963. He played quarterback for Pitt's football team, and his teammates included Mike Ditka. Traficant was drafted in the NFL's twentieth round (276th overall) by the Pittsburgh Steelers in 1963, and tried out for the Steelers and the Oakland Raiders of the American Football League, but did not play professionally. He later obtained an M.S. in educational administration from the University of Pittsburgh in 1973 and a second master's degree in counseling from Youngstown State University in 1976.

Early career 
At the start of his career, Traficant was the consumer finance director for the Youngstown Community Action Program. He taught courses on drug and alcohol dependency and recovery at Youngstown State University and Kent State University, as well as lecturing on drug and alcohol abuse for colleges and government agencies outside Ohio. In addition, Traficant taught at the Ohio Peace Officer Training Academy. He was the executive director of the Mahoning County Drug Program from 1971 to 1981, and Sheriff of Mahoning County from 1981 to 1985. While serving as sheriff, Traficant made national headlines by refusing to execute foreclosure orders on several unemployed homeowners, many of whom had been left out of work. This endeared him to the local population, which was dealing with a declining economy following the closures and relocations of steel making and steel-associated businesses. Traficant's career in Youngstown served as the focus of Crooked City: Youngstown, OH., a podcast produced by Marc Smerling.

In 1983, he was charged with racketeering for accepting bribes. Traficant, who represented himself in the criminal trial, argued that he accepted the bribes only as part of his own alleged secret undercover investigation into corruption. Traficant was acquitted of the charges, becoming the only person ever to win a Racketeer Influenced and Corrupt Organizations Act (RICO) case while representing himself. 

Publicity from the RICO trial increased Traficant's local visibility. He was elected as a Democrat to Congress from Ohio's 17th District, defeating Lyle Williams, a three-term Republican incumbent. He was reelected eight times without serious opposition.

U.S. House of Representatives

Traficant was infamous during his time in Congress for his short, rambling, and often crude rants on the House floor, often decrying his key issues such as his opposition to free trade and the IRS. He usually ended his speeches with the phrase "beam me up", a Star Trek reference. He also became known for his flamboyant fashion sense - including cowboy boots and polyester suits - and his toupee. 

While in Congress, Traficant was a supporter of immigration reduction, and a strong opponent of illegal immigration. In the controversy surrounding the defeat of Congressman Bob Dornan (R-CA) by Democrat Loretta Sanchez, Traficant was the only Democratic member of Congress who advocated a new election, owing to Dornan's allegations of voting in that race by undocumented immigrants. The allegations went unproven, and a new election was not held.

Traficant's major legislative accomplishment in the House was the adoption of some of his proposals to constrain enforcement activities by the Internal Revenue Service against delinquent taxpayers. Traficant was also known for frequently pushing to include "Buy American" provisions in spending bills. 

After the Republicans took control of the House in 1995, Traficant tended to vote more often with the Republicans than with his own party. On the issue of abortion, Traficant voted with the position of the National Right to Life Committee 95% of the time in the 105th Congress, and 100% of the time in the 106th and 107th Congresses. However, he voted against all four articles of impeachment against Bill Clinton. After he voted for Republican Dennis Hastert for Speaker of the House in 2001, the Democrats stripped him of his seniority and refused to give him any committee assignments. Because the Republicans did not assign him to any committees either, Traficant became the first member of the House of Representatives in over a century—outside the top leadership—to lack a single committee assignment.

Defense of John Demjanjuk
Traficant championed the unpopular case of John Demjanjuk, a Ukrainian-born autoworker from Seven Hills who had been convicted in Israel and sentenced to hang for having been the brutal Nazi concentration camp guard Ivan the Terrible. For almost a decade, Traficant (along with Pat Buchanan) insisted that Demjanjuk had been denied a fair trial, and been the victim of mistaken identity; in 1993 the Supreme Court of Israel overturned the conviction, on the basis of doubt. Demjanjuk was later deported to Germany on May 11, 2009, after the Supreme Court of the United States refused to overturn his deportation order. Demjanjuk was tried and convicted by a German criminal court of being an accessory to murder, but died before the German Appellate Court could hear his case, thereby voiding the conviction.

Defense of Arthur Rudolph
Following Pat Buchanan's recommendation to reconsider the denaturalization of former Nazi and NASA scientist Arthur Rudolph, who had been brought to the United States under Operation Paperclip, Traficant spoke to the Friends of Arthur Rudolph, an organization based in Huntsville, Alabama. He argued that denaturalization had happened because of a "powerful Jewish lobby" influencing Congress. He added that it was a violation of a United States citizen's civil rights, and he suggested that Rudolph return to the United States nonetheless. Additionally, he "introduced a resolution in Congress [...] calling for an investigation into the OSI's handling of Rudolph's case." Meanwhile, in 1990, Traficant had planned to meet Rudolph in Niagara Falls, on the Canadian–American border; however, Rudolph was arrested by immigration officials in Toronto, and the meeting never occurred.

Trial and expulsion
In 2001, Traficant was indicted on federal corruption charges for taking campaign funds for personal use. Again, he opted to represent himself, insisting that the trial was part of a vendetta against him dating back to his 1983 trial. After a two-month federal trial, on April 11, 2002, he was convicted of ten felony counts including bribery, racketeering, and tax evasion. Per longstanding House convention, House Democrats directed him not to cast any votes pending an investigation by the United States House Committee on Ethics.

Eventually, the House Ethics Committee recommended that Traficant be expelled from Congress. On July 24, the House voted to expel him in a 420-1 vote. The sole vote against expulsion was Representative Gary Condit, who at the time was in the midst of a scandal of his own and had been defeated in his reelection primary. Traficant was the first representative to be expelled since Michael Myers in 1980 as a result of the Abscam scandal.

After his expulsion, Traficant ran as an independent candidate for another term in the House while incarcerated at the United States Penitentiary, Allenwood. He received 28,045 votes, or 15 percent, and became one of only a handful of individuals in the history of the United States to run for a federal office from prison. The election was won by one of his former aides, Tim Ryan.

Prison and later life

Incarceration 
Traficant entered the Federal Correctional Institution, Allenwood Low, on August 6, 2002, with the Federal Bureau of Prisons ID # 31213-060. He served his first seventeen months at Allenwood. He claimed that he was put in solitary confinement shortly after his arrival for incitement to riot after he told a guard, "People can't hear you. Speak up." During the seven years of his incarceration, Traficant refused any visitors, saying that he didn't want anyone to see him. He was released on September 2, 2009, at age 68, and was subject to three years of supervised release.

While in prison, Traficant received support from neo-Nazi David Duke, who urged visitors to his personal website to donate to his personal fund. Duke posted a letter written by Traficant stating that he was targeted by the United States Department of Justice for, among other things, defending John Demjanjuk. Traficant also claimed, in the letter, that he knew facts about "Waco, Ruby Ridge, Pan Am Flight 103, Jimmy Hoffa and the John F. Kennedy assassination", which he may divulge in the future. Author Michael Collins Piper, who wrote Target: Traficant, The Untold Story initially helped circulate Traficant's letter, said that "There's stuff I've written about Traficant that's showing up in places I don't even know. It's like (six) degrees of separation with the Internet now," and denied that Traficant had any direct connections to Duke.

Release 
Traficant was released from prison on September 2, 2009. On September 6, 2009, 1,200 supporters welcomed him home at a banquet with an Elvis impersonator, and a Traficant lookalike contest. "Welcome home Jimbo" was printed on T-shirts. "I think it's time to tell the FBI and the IRS that this is our country and we're tired—tired of the pressure, tired of the political targeting, tired of a powerful central government that is crippling America," he said. He also said he was considering running for his old seat in Congress. Traficant signed a limited, three-month contract to work as a part-time weekend talk radio host for Cleveland news/talk station WTAM in January 2010. His contract permitted him to quit if he chose to run for office.

On November 2, 2009, a column by Traficant in the American Free Press continued his defense of the accused concentration camp guard John Demjanjuk. Michael Collins Piper defended Traficant against his accusers.

2010 congressional campaign 
In September 2010, Traficant was certified to run for the same seat he held before his expulsion, and said that his platform would be to repeal the Sixteenth Amendment to the United States Constitution. Traficant lost the election to his former aide Tim Ryan, to whom he lost an earlier race in 2002, in which Traficant ran as an independent from his prison cell. Traficant received 30,556 votes, or 16%.

Post-prison life 
After his release from prison, he was featured as a guest speaker at a Tea Party protest in Columbiana, Ohio, among other events affiliated with reactionary politics.
Traficant later went on to purchase a 5 bedroom farm in Greenford, Ohio.

Traficant began a grassroots campaign in July 2014, "Project Freedom USA", to, among other things, put people pressure on Congress to get rid of the IRS and "divorce" the Federal Reserve.

Accident and death
Traficant was injured in an accident at his farm in Greenford, Ohio on September 23, 2014. A tractor he was driving into a pole barn flipped over and trapped him underneath. Traficant was taken to Salem Regional Medical Center in Salem, Ohio, then airlifted to St. Elizabeth's Health Center in Youngstown. On the evening of September 24, his wife described him as "sedated and not doing well".

By September 26, via news reports and statements from attorney and family spokesman Heidi Hanni, it was learned that the family was awaiting the doctors' assessment; there was no word as to whether or not Traficant had suffered a heart attack, but he was still unconscious and was being sedated for pain and other reasons. A number of longtime family friends, including Linda Kovachik, a former congressional aide to Traficant, told The Vindicator that it is believed Traficant had a heart attack, causing the tractor accident.

A text message was sent out Friday evening September 26 by Jim Condit Jr., the Constitution Party candidate for Ohio's 8th congressional district and a close friend who had been traveling with Traficant to help promote Project Freedom USA. The text message stated that "the machines were disconnected at 2:00 p.m. (Friday). He is still breathing. Thousands are praying." On September 27, 2014, Traficant died at a hospice in Poland, Ohio, aged 73. By September 29, Traficant's body had been buried in an undisclosed location after the family had a private funeral, and announced that there would be no public funeral for him.

A subsequent medical investigation determined that Traficant had not had a heart attack or seizure before the accident, and was not under the influence of drugs or alcohol. In addition, he had not sustained any crushing injuries in the accident. The forensic pathologist who conducted the examination attributed Traficant's death to positional asphyxiation, stating that he had been unable to breathe because of the weight of the tractor on top of him.

Publications

See also
 List of United States representatives from Ohio
 List of United States representatives expelled, censured, or reprimanded
 List of American federal politicians convicted of crimes
 List of federal political scandals in the United States

References

External links

 
 "Look at what Traficant swept under the rug" – CNN, August 1, 2002
 Traficant quarterbacking Pitt over Navy
 Official Website by Nicky Nelson & Jim Condit Jr., Project Freedom USA
 James Traficant - A Tribute (Video) by Mike Wayne

1941 births
2014 deaths
20th-century American politicians
21st-century American male writers
21st-century American non-fiction writers
21st-century American politicians
Accidental deaths in Ohio
Activists from Ohio
American football quarterbacks
American male non-fiction writers
American nationalists
American people convicted of tax crimes
American people of Hungarian descent
American political writers
American people of Italian descent
American Roman Catholics
American talk radio hosts
Candidates in the 1988 United States presidential election
Catholics from Ohio
Deaths from asphyxiation
Democratic Party members of the United States House of Representatives from Ohio
Expelled members of the United States House of Representatives
Farming accident deaths
Members of the United States Congress stripped of committee assignment
Monetary reformers
Ohio Independents
Ohio politicians convicted of crimes
Ohio sheriffs
Pittsburgh Panthers football players
Politicians convicted of bribery under 18 U.S.C. § 201
Politicians convicted of conspiracy to defraud the United States
Politicians convicted of illegal gratuities under 18 U.S.C. § 201
Politicians from Youngstown, Ohio
Prisoners and detainees of the United States federal government
Right-wing populism in the United States
University of Pittsburgh alumni
Writers from Youngstown, Ohio
Youngstown State University alumni
Candidates in the 2002 United States elections
Candidates in the 2010 United States elections